Cambrothyra (not to be confused with Cambrorhytium) is a Lower Cambrian coeloscleritophoran from China. The fossils are hollow cones with porous walls that had an originally fibrous aragonitic mineralogy.  These conical sclerites were generally not connected to other sclerites; only occasionally are they paired or twinned.
The genus comprises the sole species C. ampulliformis.

References

Cambrian invertebrates
Fossil taxa described in 1983
Enigmatic prehistoric animal genera
Cambrian animals of Asia
Cambrian genus extinctions